Charles Frank Baumrucker (March 5, 1884 – April 25, 1940) was an American jeweler, businessman, and politician.

Born in Chicago, Illinois, Baumrucker went to the Chicago public schools. Baumrucker owned a jewelry business in River Forest, Illinois. He served as president of the village of River Forest and was a Democrat. Baumrucker served in the Illinois Senate from 1935 to 1939.

Notes

External links

1884 births
1940 deaths
Politicians from Chicago
People from River Forest, Illinois
American jewellers
Mayors of places in Illinois
Democratic Party Illinois state senators
20th-century American politicians